Anyone Can Play is a 1968 Italian comedy film directed by Luigi Zampa and starring two Bond girls Ursula Andress and Claudine Auger.

Cast
 Ursula Andress as Norma
 Virna Lisi as Luisa
 Claudine Auger as Esmerelda
 Marisa Mell as Paola
 Brett Halsey as Norma's husband
 Jean-Pierre Cassel as Luisa's husband
 Frank Wolff as Paola's husband
 Marco Guglielmi as Esmerelda's husband
 Mario Adorf as Traffic cop
 Vittorio Caprioli as Thief
 Franco Fabrizi as Luisa's lover
 Luciano Salce as Psychiatrist
 Lando Buzzanca
 Stash De Rola as second mistress of Luisa
 Margherita Guzzinati as Countess Matilde
 Arthur Hansel as Playboy
 Pietro Morfea as blackmailer
 Fred Williams as Esmeralda lover
 Lia Zoppelli as mother of Luisa

References

External links

1968 films
Commedia all'italiana
1960s Italian-language films
1968 comedy films
Films directed by Luigi Zampa
Films with screenplays by Ruggero Maccari
1960s Italian films